The 1955 Italian Grand Prix was a Formula One motor race held at Autodromo Nazionale di Monza, in Monza, Italy on 11 September 1955. It was the seventh and final race of the 1955 World Championship of Drivers.

In the wake of the 1955 Le Mans disaster, the championship was still open after the British Grand Prix; although after that race (with the French Grand Prix already having been cancelled) the German, Swiss and Spanish Grands Prix were all cancelled. This meant that Fangio won the world driver's championship for the 3rd time and the 2nd time in succession.

A new concrete banking had been constructed over where the original slightly banked version was, and the combined 10 km (6.214 mi) Monza circuit was used for the first time since 1933. The Curva Sud had also been modified from 2 right hand corners into one sweeping right-hander known as the "Parabolica".

Of the 4 factory Mercedes cars in the race, Fangio and Moss drove the streamlined, closed-wheel W196's, while Kling and Taruffi drove open-wheel W196's. This was the 4th and last appearance of the streamlined Mercedes cars at a championship GP as well as the third and last time in Formula One history that a race had been won by a closed-wheel car.

This was the last Grand Prix race for 1950 world champion Nino Farina. This was also the last Grand Prix win for a Mercedes-Benz as an engine manufacturer until the 1997 Australian Grand Prix and the last Grand Prix win for Mercedes-Benz as a constructor until the 2012 Chinese Grand Prix.

Classification

Qualifying

Race

Notes
 – 1 point for fastest lap

Championship standings after the race 
Drivers' Championship standings

Note: Only the top five positions are included. Only the best 5 results counted towards the Championship. Numbers without parentheses are Championship points; numbers in parentheses are total points scored.

References

Italian Grand Prix
Italian Grand Prix
1955 in Italian motorsport